The buff-streaked chat or buff-streaked bushchat (Campicoloides bifasciatus) is a species of bird in the family Muscicapidae. It is found in Lesotho, South Africa, and Eswatini.
Its natural habitat is subtropical or tropical dry lowland grassland.

References

External links
 Buff-streaked chat - Species text in The Atlas of Southern African Birds.

buff-streaked chat
Birds of Southern Africa
buff-streaked chat
Taxonomy articles created by Polbot